The University of Santo Tomas College of Architecture is the architectural school of the University of Santo Tomas, the oldest and the largest Catholic university in Manila, Philippines.

Established in 1930, the college is one of the first architectural schools in the Philippines. It is also one of the only 2 to be proclaimed as a Center of Excellence in Architecture by the Commission on Higher Education and a consistent yop performing school in the Philippine Architecture Licensure Examination.

History
Established in 1930, it is one of the first architectural schools in the Philippines. It was renamed College of Architecture and Fine Arts in 1946 following the integration of Fine Arts degrees. The college was split in 2000, thus forming the College of Fine Arts and Design, separating the College of Architecture. The college was housed in the Roque Ruaño building which it shared with the Faculty of Engineering. It later moved in the new Beato Angelico building, together with the College of Fine Arts and Design.

Degree programs
 Undergraduate program
 Bachelor of Science in Architecture
 Graduate programs (offered at the UST Graduate School)
 Master of Science in Architecture (majors in physical Planning, urban heritage preservation, and urban design)

Notable alumni
The College has produced numerous men and women of the arts that gradually helped shaped Philippine Arts and Architecture.
Aida-Cruz Del Rosario - The first female graduate of the college (1946), and the first female architect in the Philippines. While some sources credit Eulie Chowdhury as the first woman architect in Asia, others including Aida-Cruz Del Rosario were working at similar dates, and women like Perin Jamsetjee Mistri and Dora Gad preceded them.
Ang Kiukok - national artist for visual arts
Ildefonso Santos Jr - national artist for architecture
J. Elizalde Navarro - national artist for visual arts
Leandro Locsin - national artist for architecture
Francisco Mañosa - national artist for architecture and the designer of the Coconut Palace.
Victorio Edades - national artist for visual arts
Jose Pedro "Bong" Recio - Founder of Recio+Casas Architectural firm. Designed The Shang Grand Tower, G.T. International Tower, LKG Tower, Pacific Plaza Towers in Fort Bonifacio, the UST Sports Complex, UST Multi-deck Carpark, etc.
Carmelo Casas - Founder of Recio+Casas Architectural firm. Designed The Shang Grand Tower, G.T. International Tower, LKG Tower, Pacific Plaza Towers in Fort Bonifacio, the UST Sports Complex, UST Multi-deck Carpark, etc.
Felino Palafox - Founder of Palafox Associates, ranked 94th (2006), is the only Southeast Asian Architectural firm to be included in the BD World Architecture. Designed the Rockwell Center in Makati, La Mesa Watershed, Ortigas Center, Makati Streetscape, Hidalgo Place, Jeddah Riviera Center, Saudi Arabia, Jumeirah Beach Residences, Dubai, Rabat Waterfront Development, Morocco, Rizal Tower, etc.
 Gabriel Formoso, founder of GF&P (Gabriel Formoso and Partners) the designer of  a number of notable structures such as the Asian Institute of Management, Manila Peninsula Hotel, PBCom Tower, Pacific Star building among others. 
 Engracio Mariano
 Abelardo Tolentino

References

External links
University of Santo Tomas -  Official Website

Architecture
Educational institutions established in 1930
Architecture schools
1930 establishments in the Philippines